Racing Luck is a 1948 American comedy romance sport film directed by William Berke and starring Gloria Henry.

Plot
Saddled with debts after her father's death, Phyllis Warren's most valuable properties are a pair of thoroughbreds: Flasher, which her little brother "Boots" trains and rides, and Charm Boy, which doesn't seem to run well unless Flasher is in the same race.

Charm Boy is bought at a Santa Anita claiming race by rich trainer Jeff Stuart as a gift to Natalie Gunther, his sweetheart. Phyllis, not intending to part with the horse, persuades Jeff to return him, but Natalie sees a grateful Phyllis hug him, she keeps the horse and dumps her beau.

With a big stakes race coming up, Natalie discovers that Charm Boy won't run unless Flasher does as well. A wager is made that the winning trainer gets to keep both. A barn fire results in an injury to Boots, but he still manages to ride Flasher to victory and win Charm Boy back for his sister.

Cast
Gloria Henry as Phyllis Warren
Stanley Clements as Boots Warren
David Bruce as Jeff Stuart
Paula Raymond as Natalie Gunther
Harry Cheshire as Radcliffe Malone
Dooley Wilson as Abe
Jack Ingram as George

Reception
Variety wrote that "Sam Katzman failed in his productional chores with a poor screenplay... and direction William Berke fails to give the pic a pace worthy of interest."

References

External links
Racking Luck at TCMDB
Racing Luck at IMDb
Review of film at Variety

1948 films
American horse racing films
Columbia Pictures films
1940s sports films
American black-and-white films
1940s American films